Celeirós, Aveleda e Vimieiro is a civil parish in the municipality of Braga, Portugal. It was formed in 2013 by the merger of the former parishes Celeirós, Aveleda and Vimieiro.  in an area of 7.57 km².

References

Freguesias of Braga